Glen Tourville is a retired American soccer player who currently serves as an associate coach on NC State women's soccer team.

Player
Tourville attended the Eastern Illinois University where he played on the men's soccer team in 1978 and 1979.  In 1979, the Panthers went to the NCAA Men's Division II Soccer Championship where they lost to Alabama A&M.  Financial difficulties led him to drop out of school.  In the fall of 1980, he entered the University of Illinois at Chicago where he played on the men's soccer team for two seasons.   The Dallas Tornado drafted Tourville in the 1982 NASL draft, but the team folded before the season began.  He then attended several open tryouts, gaining a contract with the Dallas Americans of the American Soccer League.  He later played for the Oklahoma City Stampede and Houston Dynamos of the United Soccer League.  In 1987, the Dynamos played in the Lone Star Soccer Alliance.  He also played for the reserve team of the San Diego Sockers of the Major Indoor Soccer League for the 1987-1988 season.

Coach
In 1982, he briefly served as an assistant coach at the University of Illinois at Chicago.  After retiring from playing, Tourville took a break from soccer for several years until he began coaching the University of San Diego's women's club team.  In 1992, he became an assistant coach at Aurora University.  In 1993, he became head coach, a position he held until 1997.  In 1995, he coached the Rockford Raptors of the USISL.  In 1997, he became the  head coach of the Hendrix College men's and women's soccer teams.  In 2007, he spent one season coaching only the men's team. He then spent one season as an assistant coach at West Texas A&M.  In August 2008, he was hired as an assistant coach of the women's team at OSU is current coach of the Ohio State women's team.  He has two sons who are also soccer players.

References

External links
Ohio State Coaching profile

American soccer coaches
American soccer players
American Soccer League (1933–1983) players
Aurora University
Dallas Americans players
Eastern Illinois Panthers men's soccer players
Houston Dynamos players
Oklahoma City Stampede players
San Diego Sockers (original MISL) players
United Soccer League (1984–85) players
USISL coaches
Living people
Association footballers not categorized by position
Year of birth missing (living people)